Elections to Cannock Chase District Council took place on 3 May 2018 on the same day as other local elections in England. A third of the council was up for election, meaning a total of 13 councillors were elected from all but two of the council's wards.

The Labour Party held control of the council by maintaining its slim majority of one. Labour held the six seats they previously won at the 2014 election but did not gain any seats from other parties. Unlike previous years, several Labour candidates stood as joint Labour and Co-operative candidates and three were elected, giving the Co-operative Party its first representation on the council.

The Conservatives strengthened their position as the largest opposition group on the council by increasing their number to 15 councillors. They were the main beneficiaries from the collapse in the UKIP vote, increasing their share by just over 20% which reversed the ground they had lost to UKIP at the 2014 election. Their numbers were previously boosted by the defection of two sitting UKIP councillors whose four-year terms were coming to an end; they held onto their seats in these areas whilst also gaining a seat from UKIP and another from an independent in Rugeley, leaving them with four gains. The Conservatives received the highest number of votes but won one seat less than Labour due to their large majorities compared with most Labour-held seats.

Meanwhile, the Green Party were the only other party to gain a seat at this election after winning the Rawnsley ward which had previously been held by UKIP; this was the only direct Green gain from UKIP in the whole country and increased the size of the Green group on the council to three. The Greens stood candidates in all but two wards and gained a higher share of the vote than in 2015 and 2016.

The Liberal Democrats fielded three candidates in their former stronghold of Rugeley. They held onto their last remaining seat in Brereton & Ravenhill but their vote continued to decline in other areas. UKIP stood candidates in seven wards but were not successful in maintaining their seat in Heath Hayes East & Wimblebury or regaining the other three seats they won in 2014. UKIP's share of the vote plummeted by 30%, dropping by as much as 37% in some wards where they stood a candidate. There were two independent candidates, including the sitting councillor for the Western Springs ward who lost his seat to Conservatives.

Results

|}

Council Composition
Prior to the election, the composition of the council was:

After the election, the composition of the council was:

Ward results
Vote share changes are based on the results achieved by parties in 2014 when these seats were last contested.

Brereton and Ravenhill

Cannock East

Cannock North

Cannock South

Cannock West

Etching Hill and the Heath

Hawks Green

Heath Hayes East & Wimblebury

Hednesford Green Heath

Hednesford North

Norton Canes

Rawnsley

Western Springs

References

2018 English local elections
2018
2010s in Staffordshire